Gnothi seauton is an ancient Greek aphorism (Greek: γνῶθι σεαυτόν), which means "know yourself" in English.

Gnothi seauton may also refer to:

"Gnothi Seauton" (Terminator: The Sarah Connor Chronicles), the second episode of the American television series Terminator: The Sarah Connor Chronicles

See also
Gnothi Seauton: Know Yourself, a 1734 poetry book by John Arbuthnot and others
Know thyself (disambiguation)